Dionisio Aguado y García (8 April 178429 December 1849) was a Spanish classical guitarist and composer of the late Classical and early Romantic periods.

Biography
Born in Madrid, he studied with Miguel García. In 1826, Aguado visited Paris, where he met and became friends with and for a while lived with Fernando Sor. Sor's duo Les Deux Amis ("The Two Friends") commemorated the friendship: one part is marked "Sor" and the other "Aguado."

Aguado's major work Escuela de Guitarra was a guitar tutorial published in 1825. As of 2011, it is still in print, with Tecla Editions releasing a reprint in 2005. In the Escuela Aguado describes his use of fingernails on the right hand as well as his invention of a "tripodison": a device that held the guitar and thus minimized the damping effect of the player's body on the guitar's back and sides. Aguado's other works include Trois Rondos Brillants (Opus 2), Le Menuet Affandangado (Opus 15), Le Fandango Varie (Opus 16), as well as numerous waltzes, minuets, and other light pieces. The more extended works require a virtuoso technique and left-hand stretches that are almost impossible on the longer string lengths of modern guitars. (See Frederick Noad, "The Classical Guitar")

Aguado returned home to Madrid in 1837 and died there aged 65.

Aguado's surname comes from the Spanish word for "soaked." (This is because an ancient relative of his, who was a knight, returned after a battle caked in mud. The nickname then eventually became the surname.)

Instruments used by Aguado y García
Of the instruments used by Aguado, two which were built by
Pierre René Lacôte, (Paris 1838) and
Etienne Laprevotte, (Paris 1838)
are held at the Museo Arqueológico Nacional in Madrid.
Aguado is known for having used a tripod to support his guitar.

List of works

Op. 1 : Douze Valses
Op. 2 : Trois Rondo Brillants
Op. 3 : Huit Petites Pièces
Op. 4 : Six Petites Pièces
Op. 5 : Quatre Andantes et Quatre Valses
Op. 6 : Nouvelle Méthode de Guitare (1834)
Op. 7 : Valses Faciles
Op. 8 : Contredanses et Valses Faciles
Op. 9 : Contredanses non difficiles
Op. 10 : Exercices Faciles et Très Utiles
Op. 11 : Les Favorites - Huit Contredanses
Op. 12 : Six Menuets & Six Valses
Op. 13 : Morceaux Agréables non difficiles
Op. 14 : Dix Petites Pièces non difficiles
Op. 15 : Le Menuet Affandangado
Op. 16 : Le Fandango Varié

Works without Opus number:
 Allegro   
 Coleccion De Andantes, Valses Y Minuetos   
 Douze Walses, Une Marche Militaire, Et Un Theme Varie
 Escuela de Guitarra (1825)
 Gran Solo (Fernando Sor's Op.14, Arr. by Aguado)   
 Muestra De Afecto Y Reconocimiento (Seis Valses)
 Valses Characteristiques
 Variaciones
 Variaciones Brillantes
Mazurka (Polish national song, Arr. by Dionisio Aguado)

References

External links

Images of Aguado
Image ref
Image ref

Sheet music
Rischel & Birket-Smith's Collection of guitar music 1 Det Kongelige Bibliotek, Denmark
Boije Collection The Music Library of Sweden
creativeguitar.org (sheetmusic largely compiled from the above primary sources)

Dionisio Aguado – Complete Works (Integrale) for Classical Guitar Classical Guitar Library

1784 births
1849 deaths
Spanish Classical-period composers
Spanish classical guitarists
Spanish male guitarists
Spanish male classical composers
Spanish Romantic composers
Composers for the classical guitar
19th-century classical composers
19th-century Spanish male musicians
19th-century guitarists